Fred Orival (died May 28, 2022), better known as Fred Hype, was a Haitian hip-hop beatmaker, composer, and producer based in Port-au-Prince.

Life and career 
Fred Orival was born in Gonaïves, Haiti.

Death 
On May 28, 2022, Orival died in the Dominican Republic.

References

External links 
 Fred Hype on YouTube

2022 deaths
People from Gonaïves
21st-century Haitian musicians
Haitian record producers